Ressia is a surname. Notable people with the surname include:

Andrés Ressia Colino (born 1977), Uruguayan writer
Romina Ressia (born 1981), Argentine photographer and artist